Amphinema is a genus of corticioid fungi in the family Atheliaceae. The widespread genus contains six species.

See also
Amphinema byssoides

References

External links

Atheliales
Atheliales genera
Taxa named by Petter Adolf Karsten